Dmytro Ivanovych Vyshnevetsky was a magnate of Ruthenian (Ukrainian) origin and an organizer of Zaporozhian Cossacks who established a stronghold on the island of Mala Khortytsia. He was also known as Baida in Ukrainian folk songs.

Biography
Dmytro Vyshnevetsky was born into the powerful family of Ruthenian magnate Ivan Wiśniowiecki (?-1542) (part of Gediminids bloodline and the youngest son of Michał Zbaraski) and Anastasia Semenivna Olizarovychevna (?-1536). The Wiśniowiecki family takes its roots from the princely family of Novhorod-Siverskyi, through Dmitriy Korybut (see Kaributas) and Anastasia of Ryazan.

At first Dmytro Vyshnevetsky lived in the town of Vyshnivets of the Kremenets Powiat (county). In 1550–1553, Vyshnevetsky became a starosta of the Cherkasy and the Kaniv Powiats. Vyshnevetsky has been called the first Cossack Hetman, although he is not mentioned with this title in the 16th-century sources.

Dmytro Baida Vyshnevetsky was an able leader, although somewhat of a reckless adventurer. He started organizing a Cossack army in 1550 against the Crimean Khanate. Displeased with the king Sigismund II Augustus's policy of Catholization and centralization of power, he was ready to go over to the Turks. However, he was appointed to fortify the island of Mala Khortytsia on the Dnipro beyond the rapids. According to Hrushevsky, Vyshnevetsky built the fortress out of his own pocket as both Sigismund II Augustus and Devlet I Giray refused to provide any assistance. Eventually he managed to develop it to the point that khan Devlet I Giray could not take it, and he deflected the khan's efforts to Russia.

In 1556 in service to Ivan the Terrible he helped lead two raids of Ukrainian Cossacks and Russians against the Crimean Tatars around Ochakiv.  In 1558 he raided around Perekop. In 1559 he raided down the Donets and Don. With the start of the Livonian War, Ivan turned his attention west and Vyshnevetsky, being Ivan's close relative and his governor in the North Caucasus, returned to the Lithuanian service with a great number of his Adyghe warriors. His Pyatigorsky detachments became the major military force of the Polish-Lithuanian Commonwealth in centuries to come. In 1561, at the request of the Lithuanian prince, he went back to fortifying Khortytsia.

In 1563 he was involved in Moldavian affairs, perhaps hoping to obtain the throne of Moldavia, but was defeated by the Turks, taken prisoner, and after the refusal of Ivan the Terrible to free his relative, he was tortured to death in Constantinople.

Vyshnevetsky's fortifications on Khortytsia, called sich, served as a prototype for later fortifications of the Zaporizhian Sich.

In popular culture

Probably not having any relationship to the situation, Vyshnevetsky's portrait is clearly featured in the epic-movie The Deluge by Jerzy Hoffman.

He also appears as an antagonist in The Ringed Castle, a 1971 novel by Dorothy Dunnett.

In the film Propala Hramota (The lost letter, 1972), a fragment of the above-mentioned old Ukrainian folk song was sung by Ivan Mykolaychuk:

See also 
 List of Ukrainian rulers

References

Bibliography

External links
 Arkadii Zhukovsky. Vyshnevetsky, Dmytro in the Encyclopedia of Ukraine, vol. 5 (1993).
 

Hetmans of the Zaporozhian Cossacks
Dmytro
1516 births
1563 deaths
People from Ternopil Oblast
Zaporozhian Cossack nobility